Mistigri is French for "pussy cat" or "kitten" and may refer to:
 Mistigri (film), a 1931 French film
 Mistigri (racehorse), a racehorse
 Mistigri (card game), a gambling and family card game